This list of Arabic exonyms includes names which are significantly different from the names of the same places in other languages, as well as names of Arabic origin in countries (especially Spain) where Arabic is no longer spoken. Some of these exonyms are no longer in use, these are marked by italics.

Places not mentioned are generally referred to in Arabic by their respective names in their native languages, adapted to Arabic phonology as necessary.

France

Italy

Netherlands

Portugal

Spain

Turkmenistan

United Kingdom

See also

References

Exonym
Lists of exonyms